CBC News Magazine (later known as Newsmagazine) was a weekly Canadian news television series which debuted on CBC Television on September 8, 1952. The series presented the week's international news highlights and documentaries from CBC correspondents around the world. It ran until 1981 when it was cancelled in order to make way for The Journal.

Lorne Greene, then an announcer and newsreader for the CBC, was narrator for the series in its early years. It was hosted by the anchor of The National from the 1970s until its demise.

External links
 Queen's University Directory of CBC Television Series (CBC News Magazine archived listing link via archive.org)
 Newsmagazine from the Canadian Communications Foundation

1952 Canadian television series debuts
1981 Canadian television series endings
Black-and-white Canadian television shows
CBC Television original programming
CBC News
1950s Canadian television news shows
1960s Canadian television news shows
1970s Canadian television news shows
1980s Canadian television news shows